Alexander I Palace in Taganrog is a one-story stone building in Russian classicism style on Grecheskaya Street, 40 where Russian emperor Alexander I died in 1825. 

The mansion was built in 1806 and belonged to different owners. The most significant of them was the Governor of Taganrog Pyotr Papkov. Emperor Alexander I of Russia stayed there twice – in 1818 and 1825. After his death the building was bought by his widow empress consort Elizabeth Alexeievna (Louise of Baden) and the first memorial museum in Russia dedicated to the Emperor was established there. Among the visitors to the palace of Alexander I were the Russian emperors Alexander II of Russia and Alexander III, poets Alexander Pushkin and Vasily Zhukovsky, artist Ivan Aivazovsky, People’s commissar of enlightenment Anatoly Lunacharsky, and many others.

For 12 years beginning in 1864 an amateur choir conducted by Pavel Chekhov (Anton Chekhov's father) sang in the Church of Exaltation of the Cross, which was established within the mansion to honor the emperor. At the end of 1860s – beginning of 1870s Alexander, Nicolas and Anton Chekhov sang there in choral parts of descant and alto. In 1928 the memorial museum was closed and some of the exhibits were moved into the Alferaki Palace. 

The building of the Palace of Alexander I houses a children’s sanatorium called “Beryozka”.

Gallery

References 
 Taganrog Encyclopedia (Энциклопедия Таганрога), 2nd edition, Taganrog, 2003

Buildings and structures in Taganrog
Houses completed in 1806
Palaces in Russia
Cultural heritage monuments of regional significance in Rostov Oblast
Cultural heritage monuments in Taganrog